The 18th Moscow International Film Festival was held from 1 to 12 July 1993. The Golden St. George was awarded to the French-Belarusian film Me Ivan, You Abraham directed by Yolande Zauberman.

Jury
 Claude Lelouch (France – President of the Jury)
 Gila Almagor (Israel)
 Jacek Bromski (Poland)
 Pavel Lungin (Russia)
 Tilda Swinton (Great Britain)

Films in competition
The following films were selected for the main competition:

Awards
 Golden St. George: Me Ivan, You Abraham by Yolande Zauberman
 Special Silver St. George: Drumroll by Sergei Ovcharov
 Prizes:
 Best Actor: Lee Deok-hwa for I Will Survive
 Best Actress: Hülya Avşar for Berlin in Berlin
 Diploma for the Direction: Emil Stang Lund for Bat Wings
 Diploma for the Script: Gilles Desjardins for Les Pots cassés
 Prix of Ecumenical Jury:
 Drumroll by Sergei Ovcharov
 Jonah Who Lived in the Whale by Roberto Faenza

References

External links
Moscow International Film Festival: 1993 at Internet Movie Database

1993
1993 film festivals
Moscow
1993 in Moscow
Moscow
July 1993 events in Russia